Ottana is a comune (municipality), former bishopric and Latin titular see in the Province of Nuoro in the Italian region Sardinia, located about  north of Cagliari and about  southwest of Nuoro.

The town is known for its traditional carnival costumes, including distinctive masks worn by the Boes, Merdules and Filonzana.

Ottana borders the following municipalities: Bolotana, Noragugume, Olzai, Orani, Sarule, Sedilo.

It is home to the Romanesque church of San Nicola.

Ecclesiastical history 
In 1110 was established a bishopric of Ottana (Italiano) or Othana in Latin.
On 1503.12.08 it was suppressed and its territory reassigned to establish the Diocese of Alghero.

Residential Ordinaries 
(all Roman Rite)
Bishops of Ottana 
 Giovanni (1116? – ?)
 Ugo (1139? – ?)
 Zaccaria (1170? – ?)
 Ugo (1176? – ?)
 Gregorio (1205? – ?)
 Gonario (1231.06.16 – ?)
 Costantino (1237? – ?)
 Silvestro (1340? – ?)
 Francesco (1344.06.13 – ?)
 Pietro (1349.01.14 – ?)
 Arnaldo Simone (1355.02.13 – ?), previously Bishop of Butrinto (? – 1355.02.13)
uncanonical Giovanni Lavoratore, Friars Minor (O.F.M.) (1386.04.16 – ? without papal mandate)
 Domenico (1386.05.26 – ?)
 Giovanni (1388.06.26 – ?)
 Nicola (1389.09.03 – 1400.06.14), later Bishop of Sorres (1400.06.14 – ?)
uncanonical Gerardo di Bisarchio (Gérard de Gisors), Carmelite Order (O. Carm.) (1390.11.21 – 1402.08.28), later Bishop of Bethléem à Clamecy (Burgundy, France) (1402.08.28 – death 1403), neither see under papal mandate
 Biagio  (1400.06.14 – ?)
 Simone Mancha, Vallombrosan Benedictines (O.S.B. Vall.) (1429.02.11 – death 1454)
 Giovanni de Sallinis, O.F.M. (1454.05.31 – 1471.06.17), later Bishop of Bosa (Italy) (1471.06.17 – death 1484)
 Antonio di Alcala (1472.08.25 – death 1472)
 Gerolamo di Setgi, O.F.M. (1474.09.08 – death 1475)
 Ludovico Camagni, O.F.M. (1481.02.07 – death 1483)
 Domenico di Milia (1483.09.11 – ?)
 Giovanni Perez (1501.07.23 – death 1503)

Titular see 
Only in October 2004 it was nominally restored as Latin Titular bishopric of the lowest (Episcopal) rank, named Ottana (in Curiate Italian) or Othana in Latin.

It has had the following incumbents :
 Titular Bishop Lorenzo Ghizzoni (2006.02.17 – 2012.11.17) as Auxiliary Bishop of Reggio Emilia–Guastalla (Italy) (2006.02.17 – 2012.11.17), later Metropolitan Archbishop of Ravenna–Cervia (Italy) (2012.11.17 – ...)
 Titular Bishop Piotr Sawczuk (2013.01.19 – ...), Auxiliary Bishop of Siedlce (Poland)

References

Source and External links 
 GCatholic with incumbent bio links

Cities and towns in Sardinia